Henrique do Rego Almeida (16 November 1936 in Curitiba – 22 March 2021 in Curitiba) was a Brazilian businessman and politician.

Biography
He served as a Senator from 1991 to 1999, representing the state of Amapá.

References

1936 births
2021 deaths
Deaths from the COVID-19 pandemic in Paraná (state)
Members of the Federal Senate (Brazil)